Moser a.s. is a luxury glass manufacturer based in Karlovy Vary, Czech Republic (previously Ludwig Moser & Sons in Bohemia, Austria-Hungary). The company is known for manufacturing stemware, decorative glassware (such as vases, ashtray, candlestick), glass gifts and various art engravings. Moser is one of the most collected of 20th century decorative glass and has been used everywhere from palaces to local restaurants. From its beginnings in 1857, as a polishing and glass engraving workshop, it developed into a lead-free glass manufacturer lasting through the 20th century until the present. It is considered as the most luxurious Czech brand as well as one of the world's most famous brands of luxury crystal. Every piece of glass that is made by Moser is hand made.

History

The original company Moser glassworks, founded in 1857 by Ludwig Moser in Karlovy Vary (called Karlsbad at the time), was a glass workshop initially devoted to polishing and engraving glass blanks; only later did the company begin designing and making its own art glass products. Engraving blanks, from Loetz, Meyr's Neffe and Harrachov was performed by the workshop in the early years. At the Vienna International Exhibition of 1873 he was awarded a medal for merit; that same year he was appointed the exclusive supplier of glass to the Emperor Franz Joseph I. He would win numerous other awards in the coming years, including medals at the World Exhibitions in Paris in 1879, 1889 and 1900, and the World Exhibition in Chicago in 1893. Ludwig took over a glass factory in Dvory (now part of Karlovy Vary) in 1893 to create a full service glassworks employing 400 people, later under the name Glassworks Ludwig Moser & Sons where his sons Gustav and Rudolf also worked.

In 1904 Moser received a warrant to supply the Imperial Court of the Emperor of Austria and four years later became supplier to Edward VII. In 1915 the company exhibited at the Panama-Pacific International Exposition and was again awarded a medal, which Louis Comfort Tiffany and Charles Tuthill thought well deserved due to the outstanding quality of the hot glass applied decorations on coloured Bohemian glass. Art Nouveau glass pieces were produced Moser with surface decoration with natural themes and simple cameo glass. They also used the Eckentiefgravur technique employing a sharp angular body deeply cut in the form of intaglio flowers.

Following the death of his father in 1916, Leo Moser took over the direction and the company expanded significantly resulting in their recognition by a Grand Prize award at the Paris International Exhibition of Decorative Art in 1925. They also exhibited in London, Belgium, Italy and Vienna. The Art Nouveau designs of heavily engraved lilies and the Fipop series from c1914 were some of the most notable pieces. Several cheaper lower quality derivatives of the Fipop designs were produced by other companies and between 1927 and 1933 two American glassmakers made copies calling them Woodland and Deerwood. Moser was one of the few Czechoslovakian glassmakers to sign their pieces.

The depression of the early 1930s exacted its toll, reducing its staff to 240, eventually Leo resigned from the company in 1932. Later, having sold their company shares in the company in 1938, they fled the county after areas of Czechoslovakia were annexed. The city of Karlovy Vary was occupied by Nazi Germany in 1938 after the Munich Agreement and the family fled the country during this anti-Semitic period. Because of its international reputation, the company was able to retain some independence during the communist era while the rest of the Czech glass industry was nationalised in 1948 (Crystalex).

Glass of Kings and King among Glass
The slogan Moser - the king of glass originated in January 1869, when the director of the Vienna Museum for Art and Industry Rudolf Eitelberger issued a certificate about the perfection of Ludwig Moser's glass. Its quality was also confirmed by the medal from 1873 Vienna World's Fair. This year, Moser became an official supplier of glass to Vienna for the Austrian Imperial Court of Franz Joseph I. Since 1901 for the Persian Shah Mozaffar ad-Din Shah Qajar and from 1908 for King Edward VII of England. Later also for Pope Pius XI, the Turkish sultan Abdul Hamid II., and the king Luís I of Portugal and his wife, Maria Pia of Savoy. At that time, Moser already had a sales office in New York, London, Paris and St. Petersburg. 

In a year 1947, Czechoslovakian President Edvard Benes gifted a monogrammed Splendid set to future Queen of England Elizabeth II. as a wedding gift to her and her husband Prince Philip. In 2007, the anniversary of the Queen's diamond wedding, more cups and a bowl were added to the set, offered to the Queen by the Czech President Vaclav Klaus during an audience at Buckingham Palace. In 2004, the Splendid set was gifted for the Royal Wedding in Copenhagen.  

Thus, the nickname of the Moser glassworks spread to Glass of Kings and King among Glass.

The Story of The Moser Glass Colors 

Even in the late 19th century colored glass didn't play as significant a role in Moser's product range as it does today. Ever since Ludwig Moser founded the glassworks in 1893, its main priority was mainly crystal glass. In Bohemian glassworks the colorless, clear and hard potash glass was typically and traditionally used, as it was particularly suitable for processing and decoration through grinding and engraving. 

Colored molten glass began to find prominence in Moser's production with the advent on the Art Nouveau style. Partially green, violet and sometimes orange, pink or blue layered vases and goblets created backgrounds for deeply engraved compositions of plant motifs. A substantial turn towards the use of colored glass, however, come after 1908, when Loe Moser takes up the position of technical director. He experiments with melting copper colored ruby red glass, and in 1915 showcases the first collection of thick-walled heavy monochrome vases with regular facet cuts at the Modern Czech Glass exhibition in Prague. After 1915, he introduces basic glass colors into regular production, they are given attractive gem names - purple Ametyst, dark green Smaragd, browish-yellow Yopas and cobalt-blue Saphir. In 1923 he adds the yellow-green Radion colored with uranium compounds and at the same time black Hyalith glass, though only in small amounts. 

In 1927 Leo Moser's technological innovation and artistic sagacity, especially his effort to find a select and exclusive face for Moser's production, brought cooperation with Berlin's specialist in the area of chemical glass colors. The result of a two-year experiment, and a series of test smelts, were special, completely new types of molten glass colored with oxides of rare earths (neodymium, praseodymium). These have a surprising quality. Their color changes depending on artificial or daylight - Heliolit, changing from sandy yellow to green, purple-violet of Alexandrit and yellow-green of Prasemit. Moser first introduced cut glass vases with a distinct color play at the Spring Fair in Leipzig in 1929, the same year, their names were registered as trademarks. A year later Moser expanded the series with the purple-red Royalit and 1932 saw the entry of the golden-yellow Eldor. In the late 1920s, Moser also begins to melt the blue-green colored Beryl.

Today the Moser Glassworks ties in to Leo Moser's extremely valuable legacy and purposefully develops in further, both in its use of high-quality ecologically friendly unleaded crystal with exceptional optical qualities, and in the exclusive glass color use in conjunction with unique, artistically progressive design by major artists.

Moser Glass and the Karlovy Vary International Film Festival 
From the middle of last century, the Moser Glassworks had a very close relationship with film and film start. First, by means of the Giant Snifters, Moser glass found itself in the immediate vicinity of film stars. The set was gradually presented at the international film festival in Cannes, Karlovy Vary and Sorrento. Today the glasswork's relationship with film and its creators has been confirmed by it being a partner of the festival in Karlovy Vary, which is annually attended by many artists and film buffs from around the world. Moser Glassworks is traditionally the exclusive supplier of the unique festival prizes, which have changed several times over the decades. The estival prize's latest look is from 2000, when the IFF team's initial idea was perfected by photographer Tono Stano. The prize, whose basis is created by Moser's glass blowers, also played a lead role in the festival's opening shorts, which launch the film festival's programs every year. Winners of the prize for outstanding contribution to world cinema, for example, the directors Věra Chytilová and Miloš Forman or actors Helen Mirren, John Malkovich, Danny DeVito, Jude Law, John Travolta, Mel Gibson, Sharon Stone or Andy Garcia, perform with it in humorous skits.

The Giant Snifters Club  
A crisis in the sales of luxury brand glass was averted by returning the shops in Prague and Karlovy Vary to the glassworks. The Prague shop was even left with its traditional name - Bohemia-Moser. The shop then became a means for trade with diplomats, the Chamber of Commerce and government circles. Great credit in increasing the prosperity of foreign trade with glass must go to the shop's director, František Chocholatý, who, thanks to his diplomatic skills, acquired many business and social contacts, which the glassworks used for many years. It was here that the Giant Snifters Club was founded in the second half of the 1950s.

The founding of the Giant Snifters Club was an event of huge social significance for Moser glass. The inauguration ceremony involved choosing a snifter, whose shape matches the physiognomy of the future Giant Snifters Club Member, and making it 'dance'. Alfthough the brand was patented in the 1960, the tradition of the Club, which accepted important personalities of the cultural, political and sports world, goes back to 1957 when the set was designed.

Members of the Giant Snifters Clubs are for example: Whoopi Goldberg, former Japanese Princess Sayako, Robert Redford, Louis Armstrong and his wife Lucille Armstrong, former Spanish King Juan Carlos I and his wife Queen Sophia, former United States Secretary of State Madeleine Albright and former Czech president Václav Havel, and many more.

Today

Ludwig Moser developed a lead-free sodium-potassium glass that is more ecologically friendly than lead glass yet is extremely hard; it remains the basis of their products. Moser still produces some of its classic Fipop designs. A factory museum shows the 150-year story of the company in more than 2,000 pieces on display supplemented by documentaries and audio guides. Besides having four retail outlets in the Czech Republic, two in Prague and two in the company's hometown Karlovy Vary, which one of them is in the famous Grandhotel Pupp, and one in Dubai Design District, Moser has a worldwide network of retailers. Moser's US distribution company was established in Northern Virginia in 1957.

Awards 
The People’s Choice category of Czech Grand Design 2012, awarded by the Academy of Design of the Czech Republic, went to Lukáš Jabůrek for his design of the Pear vase. The artwork soon ranks among the bestsellers.

See also
 Praseodymium
 Didymium

References and sources
Notes

Sources

External links

 Czech Design
 Moser glass marks
 Official website
 The History of Moser Glass - Andrew Lineham

Glassmaking companies of the Czech Republic
Manufacturing companies of Czechoslovakia
Karlovy Vary
Design companies established in 1857
Manufacturing companies established in 1857
Purveyors to the Imperial and Royal Court
Art Nouveau
Czech brands
Luxury brands
1857 establishments in the Austrian Empire